Lessons in the Language of Love is a 1995 Australian short film directed by Scott Patterson. It was screened in the Un Certain Regard section at the 1995 Cannes Film Festival.

Cast
 Gabrielle Adkins as Sue
 Marianne Bryant as Lou
 Anni Finsterer as Nicki
 Alan Flower as Stinky
 Richard Roxburgh as Harry

References

External links

1995 films
1995 short films
1995 drama films
Australian drama short films
Australian black-and-white films
Films directed by Scott Patterson
1990s English-language films
1990s Australian films